Belmont Secondary School is located in Langford, a western suburb of Victoria, British Columbia, Canada. It is one of three secondary schools in School District 62 Sooke right now.  It serves the suburban West Shore area of Colwood, Highlands, Langford, and Metchosin.

History
The first secondary school in the area was established on the school's former Jacklin Road site soon after the Second World War in re-located Army buildings. Several years later, two schools were constructed in permanent buildings:  Elizabeth Fisher Junior High School and Belmont High School. These were merged in 1973 into Belmont-Fisher Secondary School, and a new library was constructed to connect the adjacent buildings. After two years under this name, it was shortened to the current Belmont Secondary School.

New facilities
In December 2012, it was announced that Belmont was to be replaced with two new grade 9-12 schools: a 1,200-student replacement Belmont Secondary in the Glen Lake area of Langford, and a new 800-student Royal Bay Secondary School to be built in Colwood. The new facilities were intended to support a wide range of programs, including expanded students' skills and trades training. Additional programs such as culinary arts and automotive technician are being considered and links to the shipbuilding industry with possible metal fabrication and marine trades training programs are being explored. Both new schools will have Neighbourhood Learning Centres to provide community services.

In June 2013, construction commenced on the $53.9-million Belmont replacement school on the site of the former Glen Lake Elementary School. Even before its replacement had been completed, the sale of the former site to food retailer Sobeys was announced on April 3, 2014. The new Belmont Secondary School opened to students for the first time on September 8, 2015.

Academies
In addition to a challenging academic program ( including Dual Credit & AP classes), Belmont Secondary offers students the opportunity to participate Academy programs.
 Baseball Academy
 Softball Academy
 Hockey Academy

Career programs
 Secondary School Apprenticeship
 Camosun College Partnership Programs
 Accelerated Credit Enrollment in Industry Training (ACE IT):
 ACE IT/Dual Credit Carpentry Program
 ACE IT Cosmetology Program
 ACE IT/Dual Credit Automotive Service Technician
 ACE IT/Dual Credit Joinery/Cabinetmaking Program

Music
Belmont Secondary offers the following music programs and courses:
Concert Band, Concert Choir, Vocal Jazz, Jazz Band, R & B Band, Drumline, Beginning Guitar, Music Composition and Production/Electronic Music, AP Music Theory, Beginning Piano and Senior Winds.

Athletics
The school offers the following athletic and sports programs:
 Badminton
 Football
 Softball
 Basketball
 Golf
 Cross Country
 Hockey
 Volleyball
 Rugby
 Weight Room
 Soccer
 Dance
 Track and Field
Mountain Biking

Notable alumni

 Alex Newhook – NHL Player, Colorado Avalanche
 Tyson Barrie – NHL Player, Colorado Avalanche
 Adam Cracknell NHL Player, Vancouver Canucks
 Greg Zannon – NHL Player, Colorado Avalanche
 Jennifer Tilly – actress
 Paul Hyde – musician and record producer (noted as a founding member of the bands The Payola$ and Rock and Hyde).
 Bob Rock – musician, sound engineer, and record producer (noted as a founding member of the bands The Payola$ and Rock and Hyde).
 Larry Pollard - a former Canadian NASCAR Busch Grand National Series driver.
 Mike Rowe – noted for establishing www.MikeRoweSoft.com and the ensuing lawsuit with software giant Microsoft.
 Cory Monteith – actor (Glee)
 Ryder Hesjedal – UCI World Tour professional cyclist for Trek-Segafredo, winner of the 2012 Giro d'Italia, 6th overall in the 2010 Tour de France

References

External links
 School webpage
 School District webpage
 Microsoft Sues Teenager Mike Rowe
 WestShore Literacy Program
 School District facilities plan update 2010
 Belmont Secondary Young Leaders video
 Neighbourhood Learning Centres webpage
 Belmont Alumni - history

High schools in British Columbia
Educational institutions in Canada with year of establishment missing